Chandra Mauli Upadhyay is an Indian astrologer.

Chandra Mauli Upadhyay is an avid scholar of Indian astrology. Born in the year 1955 in the holy Varanasi city of Uttar Pradesh, India. Upadhyay is Head of the Department of Astrology center at Banaras Hindu University, Varanasi. He is a Ph.D holder in astrology from Banaras Hindu University, Varanasi and teaches Jyotish (astrology) in SVDV, BHU as Professor. Shri Upadhyay has been teaching the science of astrology since 1989. He started learning the knowledge of astrology since his childhood under the guidance of his father and legendary astrologer Pandit Prof. Rajmohan Upadhyay, former dean of Jyotish Department, Banaras Hindu University and Chief Editor of Vishwa Panchangam. Chandra Mauli Upadhyay has been honoured by Shri Kashi Vishwanath Mandir Trust for extraordinary contribution in the field of astrology and also by many other societies and organizations like Ganga Seva Nidhi, Rotary Club etc. for the special contribution in the field of astrology and education. 
Apart from being an educationist with innovative ideas, Upadhyay is associated with institutions such as Sri Kashi Vishwanath Temple, Varanasi (One of the Twelve Jyotirlingas) as Trustee. He is also the Trustee of one of the oldest temple of India, Mundeshwari Devi Temple in Bihar, India.

Positions held 
 Head of the Department Jyotish, Banaras Hindu University
 Professor, Banaras Hindu University
 Trustee, Shri Kashi Vishwanath Temple, Varanasi
 Founder Member, Saarvbhaum Pandit Mahasabha, Varanasi
 Treasurer, Jyotish Vigyan Samiti, Varanasi
 Executive Manager, Shri Kashi Vishwanath Temple, Banaras Hindu University Varanasi
 Trustee of Mundeshwari Temple in Bihar
 Member of Academic council Jammu Central University

Publications 

Books
Daivajnabharnam
Vastuprabandha
Sarvijaytantram
Samudrik Jyotish
Kuja Dosha Parihar
Gol Vimarsha
Prashna Vimarsha

References

External links 
 Times of India
 Times of India

Living people
Indian astrologers
1955 births
20th-century astrologers
21st-century astrologers